B.L.E.S.S.E.D is the second Japanese studio album (third overall) by South Korean girl group EXID. It was released on August 19, 2020, by Tokuma Japan Communications.

Release 
The album was released in three physical editions: Normal edition, First Press Limited Edition and CD+DVD edition, in addition as a digital album. All versions were released on August 19, 2020.

Commercial performance 
B.L.E.S.S.E.D debuted and peaked at number 16 on the Oricon Albums Chart for the week dated August 31, 2020. It debuted and peaked at number 28 on Billboard Japan's Hot Albums for the week dated August 31. It also debuted and peaked at number 13 on Billboard Japan's Top Albums Sales chart with 2,668 estimated copies sold.

Track listing

Charts

References 

2020 albums